John Sharp was a Scottish footballer who played mainly as a inside left. The bulk of his career (seven seasons) was spent with Heart of Midlothian, with the closest he came to winning a trophy being an appearance on the losing side in the final of the 1919 Victory Cup  (although a one-off wartime competition, this had some prestige as it was held after World War I had ended, and the regular Scottish Cup was not contested during the war years). Sharp also played for Albion Rovers, and bookended his time in the senior leagues with spells at Bathgate.

References

19th-century births
Year of birth missing
20th-century deaths
Year of death missing
Scottish footballers
Association football inside forwards
Heart of Midlothian F.C. players
Albion Rovers F.C. players
Bathgate F.C. players
Scottish Football League players